Decker Township may refer to the following townships in the United States:

 Decker Township, Richland County, Illinois
 Decker Township, Knox County, Indiana